Cranbourne Transit is a bus operator in Melbourne, Australia. It operates 16 routes under contract to Public Transport Victoria. It is a subsidiary of the Pulitano Group.

History
In August 1953, Phillips Bus Service purchased Woods Bus Services. On 1 February 2003, Phillips Bus Service was purchased by the Pulitano Group and renamed Cranbourne Transit.

Fleet
As at January 2023, the fleet consisted of 69 buses and coaches. Cranbourne Transit's fleet livery was white with a black stripe until it was replaced with a yellow front livery in 2010. The orange and white Public Transport Victoria livery was adopted in 2016.

References

External links

Company website

Bus companies of Victoria (Australia)
Bus transport in Melbourne